The SNCASE Grognard was designed as a single-seat, low-level ground-attack aircraft. Although in development in the 1950s for the French Armée de l'Air, the program was cancelled in favor of the Sud-Ouest Vautour II.

Design and development
An Armée de l'Air specification for a ground-attack aircraft drawn up in 1948 was intended to spur the French aviation industry to produce a jet-powered design. Sud-Est entered the competition with a development of the earlier SE.2400 attack aircraft, after testing a model in the ONERA (Chalais-Meudon) wind tunnel. The design featured an unusual 47˚ swept wing design along with two stacked Nene jet engines fed by a single dorsal inlet in a compact, bulbous fuselage. The cockpit was awkwardly situated at the extreme end of the nose; the whole arrangement soon acquiring the derisive nickname: "Hunchback".

The official name SE.2410 Grognard (French: Grumbler) was derived from the nickname for a soldier of Napoleon's Old Guard. Problems encountered in test flights led to a number of modifications to the tail unit and ailerons. Development continued with Sud-Est building two prototypes with a further refinement that led to the SE.2415, identified as the Grognard II, a two-seat development that included a stretched fuselage incorporating a raised cockpit with a bubble canopy and reduced 32˚ wing sweep back. Following initial testing, two boundary layer fences were installed on the outer wings of the SE.2415; underwing spoilers were also tested.

Although neither prototype was initially armed, the planned armament array included two DEFA 30mm cannon as well as bombs and rockets.

Operational history

The first flight of Sud-Est SE.2410 Grognard I (F-ZWRJ) took place on 30 April 1950, while the second prototype (F-ZWRK) flew on 14 February 1951 but suffered from tailplane flutter.  Both prototypes underwent many weapons tests, notably becoming the first French aircraft to fire an air-to-air missile (the Matra T-10). The Grognard II was heavily  damaged in a belly landing after a false fire warning, although the airframe was salvaged and subsequently used as a target for firing tests. During the trials, the Armée de l'Air radically altered the specifications for fighter and bomber aircraft, virtually eliminating the attack category. This change jeopardized future development of the Grognard as the unpressurized airframe was not readily adaptable to other missions.

The SE.2418, incorporating the wing of the Grognard I with the lengthened fuselage and other refinements from the Grognard II  was actually  being readied for production when the program was shut down in 1952 with the Vautour multi-purpose fighter/bomber having proved to be a more promising design.

The SE.2410 was eventually retired and later scrapped by 1954.

Variants
SE.2410 Grognard I Original specifications; one prototype.
SE.2415 Grognard II Revised two-seat design with changes to wing, fuselage and cockpit; one prototype.
SE.2418 Grognard Unbuilt production single-seat version with Rolls-Royce Tays replacing the Nene engines in the prototypes.
SE.2421 Grognard Unbuilt design study for a two-seat all-weather fighter.

Specifications (SE.2410 Grognard I)

See also

Notes

Bibliography
Buttler, Tony and Jean-Louis Delezenne. X-Planes of Europe: Secret Research Aircraft from the Golden Age 1946-1974. Manchester, UK: Hikoki Publications, 2012. 

 Green, William, ed. "Facts by Request: Mighty Grumbler." Royal Air Force Flying Review, September 1968.
 Green, William and Gerald Pollinger. The Aircraft of the World. London: Macdonald, 1955. 
 Jackson, Robert. Infamous Aircraft: Dangerous Designs and their Vices. Barnsley, Yorkshire, UK: Pen and Sword Aviation, 2005. .
 Taylor, Michael J.H. Military Prototypes of the 1950s (Warbirds Illustrated No. 18). London: Arms and Armour Press, 1983. .
 Winchester, Jim. "Sud-Est SE.2410 Grognard (1950)". X-Planes and Prototypes. London: Amber Books Ltd., 2005. .

External links

 Sud-Est SE.2410 Grognard
 Sud-Est SE.2410 Grognard
  "New French Fighter Looks Like A Flying Turtle" , April 1953, Popular Science rare photo showing Grognard landing—at bottom of page 175

1950s French fighter aircraft
Grognard